Dubai Production City (DPC), formerly known as International Media Production Zone (IMPZ), is a free zone and freehold area that caters to media production companies in Dubai, United Arab Emirates. The Dubai government has plans to convert this area into the next generation of Dubai Media City.

Dubai Production City is a leading business hub enabling the global and local publishing, printing and packaging industries to excel.

Home to qualified business professionals from around the globe, Dubai Production City is a holistic community offering business, retail and residential lifestyle.

DPC was launched in 2003 as the first dedicated community aiming to advance the development of the production industry in the region.

DPC benefits from free zone privileges and regulations that facilitate the ease of business and operations, a unique and vibrant community supporting and fostering the growth of media production.

See also
Radio and television channels of Dubai

References

External links
Dubai Production City Official website

Free-trade zones of the United Arab Emirates
2003 establishments in the United Arab Emirates